Maulana Anwar-ul-Haq Haqqani is a Pakistani Islamic scholar who is currently serving as the chancellor of Darul Uloom Haqqania, a post he has held since November 2018 after the death of his brother Maulana Samiul Haq. He has also been serving as the central vice-president of Wifaq ul Madaris Al-Arabia, Pakistan, since 8 April 2009.

He is the son of Maulana Abdul Haq Akorvi and the brother of Maulana Sami ul Haq and Maulana Izhar Haq Haqqani (deceased). His elder son, Salmanul Haq, is also a teacher at Darul Uloom Haqqania.

References 

Deobandis
Pakistani Sunni Muslim scholars of Islam
People from Nowshera District
Pakistani Islamic religious leaders
Chancellors of the Darul Uloom Haqqania
Living people
Year of birth missing (living people)